Burtsev is a Russian male surname. Its feminine counterpart is Burtseva. Notable people with the surname include:

 Fyodor Burtsev (1923–2003), Soviet test pilot
 Mikhail Burtsev (1956–2015), Russian fencer
 Roman Burtsev (born 1971), Russian serial killer and pedophile
 Vladimir Burtsev (1862–1942), Russian revolutionary activist, scholar, publisher, and editor

Russian-language surnames